Erichthodes is a genus of satyrid butterflies found in the Neotropical realm.

Species
Listed alphabetically:
Erichthodes antonina (C. & R. Felder, [1867])
Erichthodes arius (Weymer, 1911)
Erichthodes jovita (C. & R. Felder, 1867)
Erichthodes julia (Weymer, 1911)
Erichthodes narapa (Schaus, 1902)

References

Euptychiina
Butterfly genera
Taxa named by Walter Forster (entomologist)